The 9th edition of the annual Holland Ladies Tour was held from August 28 to September 2, 2006. The women's stage race with an UCI rating of 2.1 started in Sint-Willebrord, and ended in Heerlen.

Stages

2006-08-28: Sint Willebrord — Sint Willebrord (118.5 km)

2006-08-29: Assen — Assen (122 km)

2006-08-30: Goor — Goor (127.2 km)

2006-08-31: Roden — Roden (78.3 km)

2006-08-31: Roden — Roden (23 km)

2006-09-01: Oirschot — Oirschot (123.6 km)

2006-09-02: Heerlen — Heerlen (110.4 km)

Classification leadership 

Source

Final standings

General Classification

Points Classification

Mountains Classification

Best Young Rider Classification

Sprint Classification

Most Aggressive Rider Classification

References 

 cyclingnews

2006
Holland Ladies Tour
Holland Ladies Tour
Cycling in North Brabant
Cycling in Overijssel
Cycling in Assen
Cycling in Heerlen
Cycling in Noordenveld
Cycling in Rucphen
Sport in Hof van Twente
Sport in Oirschot